Brent Spencer Johnson (born March 12, 1977) is an American former professional ice hockey goaltender. He played in the National Hockey League for the St. Louis Blues, Phoenix Coyotes, Washington Capitals, and the Pittsburgh Penguins. He is currently a studio analyst for NBC Sports Washington.

Playing career 

As a youth, Johnson played in the 1991 Quebec International Pee-Wee Hockey Tournament with a minor ice hockey team from Fraser, Michigan.

Originally a fifth round 1995 draft pick of the Colorado Avalanche, Johnson started his NHL career with the St. Louis Blues in the 1998–1999 season. He played there until he was traded during the 2003–04 season to the Phoenix Coyotes. Johnson was signed by the Vancouver Canucks prior to the start of the 2005–06 season, but was soon claimed on waivers by the Capitals, where he played behind both Olaf Kölzig and José Théodore.

Johnson is the grandson of NHL Hall of Famer Sid Abel and the son of former NHL goaltender Bob Johnson. Brent Johnson was in goal for the Capitals on February 4, 2006 when they played against the Tampa Bay Lightning. The Lightning's goaltender for the game was John Grahame, the son of former NHL goaltender Ron Grahame. According to the Capitals, this game was the first occasion where two second-generation NHL goaltenders competed against each other.

For the week ending November 9, 2008, Johnson was named the NHL Third Star of the Week by helping the Capitals collect five points in three games (each consecutive starts). He went 2–0–1 with a 1.63 GAA and a .953 save percentage.

He underwent hip surgery in February 2009 and was expected to be out of action two months.

Johnson was deemed expendable by Washington after the emergence of young goalie Semyon Varlamov. On July 21, 2009, Johnson was signed as a free agent to a one-year contract by the Pittsburgh Penguins to back-up Marc-André Fleury. After helping the Penguins to 10 wins in 23 games for the 2009–10 season he was signed to a two-year extension with Pittsburgh, through to the 2011–12 season on April 13, 2010. On February 2, 2011, Johnson had his first fight in the NHL when he engaged with Rick DiPietro in a fight after DiPietro and Matt Cooke collided near the goal crease. Johnson skated over to DiPietro, ignoring the referee waving him off, and took DiPietro down with one punch. It was later found out that DiPietro suffered facial fractures from the punch. Johnson received leaving crease and game misconduct penalties. The next game against the Islanders (9 days later), Johnson once again in goal, fought with Islanders center Micheal Haley along with Penguins forward Eric Godard who left the bench to assist his goaltender.

In the last year of his contract with the Penguins, during the 2011–12 season, Johnson struggled to repeat his impressive earlier form and suffered his worst season in Pittsburgh. With just six wins, he was subsequently not tendered a new contract by the Penguins and was released to free agency.

Personal 
He married Erica Danielle Ence of Burke, Virginia on August 11, 2007. The couple have two daughters.

Johnson is the grandson of NHL Hall of Famer Sid Abel and the son of former Penguins' goaltender Bob Johnson.

Johnson is also a fan of the English rock band Led Zeppelin, and often paid tribute to the band in the artwork on his goalie masks.

Career statistics

Regular season and playoffs

See also 
 Notable families in the NHL

References

External links 
 

1977 births
American men's ice hockey goaltenders
Colorado Avalanche draft picks
Hershey Bears players
Ice hockey players from Michigan
Living people
Owen Sound Platers players
People from Farmington, Michigan
Phoenix Coyotes players
Pittsburgh Penguins players
St. Louis Blues players
Washington Capitals players
Worcester IceCats players